Chrysocrambus similimellus is a moth in the family Crambidae. It was described by Johann Müller-Rutz in 1931. It is found in North Africa, where it has been recorded from Algeria and Tunisia.

References

Crambinae
Moths described in 1931